Joseph David Vitiello (born April 11, 1970), nicknamed “Heata”,  is a former American professional baseball player who was a designated hitter from –. He played for the Kansas City Royals, San Diego Padres, and Montreal Expos of Major League Baseball (MLB).

Vitiello attended the University of Alabama. In 1989 and 1990 he played collegiate summer baseball with the Hyannis Mets of the Cape Cod Baseball League and was named a league all-star in 1990. He was selected by the Royals in the first round (7th overall) of the 1991 MLB Draft.

See also
1991 College Baseball All-America Team

References

External links

1970 births
Living people
Alabama Crimson Tide baseball players
All-American college baseball players
American expatriate baseball players in Canada
American expatriate baseball players in Japan
Baseball City Royals players
Baseball players from Massachusetts
Edmonton Trappers players
Eugene Emeralds players
Fresno Grizzlies players
Hyannis Harbor Hawks players
Kansas City Royals players
Las Vegas Stars (baseball) players
Major League Baseball designated hitters
Memphis Chicks players
Montreal Expos players
Omaha Golden Spikes players
Omaha Royals players
Orix BlueWave players
Ottawa Lynx players
San Diego Padres players
Toledo Mud Hens players
American expatriate baseball players in Mexico
Naranjeros de Hermosillo players